Kaija Mäkelä (born 23 October 1930) is a Finnish former swimmer. She competed in the women's 200 metre breaststroke at the 1952 Summer Olympics.

References

External links
 

1930 births
Living people
Finnish female breaststroke swimmers
Olympic swimmers of Finland
Swimmers at the 1952 Summer Olympics
People from Hämeenlinna
Sportspeople from Kanta-Häme